Finis Conner (born July 28, 1943) is an American entrepreneur and pioneer of the disk drive industry, founding industry leaders Shugart Associates, Seagate Technology and Conner Peripherals. Conner Peripherals, a major HDD manufacturer, was founded in 1987, and by 1990 had become the fastest-growing start-up in the history of U.S. commerce up until that point. Conner Peripherals was acquired by Seagate in 1996.

Background 
Finis F Conner. (pronounced Fy-niss) was born on July 28, 1943 in Gadsden, Alabama. He was the last of five children born to a carpenter and his wife. Conner grew up poor in Alabama, Texas and Florida. At the age of 19, with $100 in his pocket, he boarded a train for San Jose, California where a brother lived. Conner found a job as a clerk-typist at IBM and put himself through college, earning a degree in industrial management from San Jose State College in 1969.

Shugart Associates 
Conner met Alan Shugart at Memorex in the early 1970s.  In 1973, Shugart, Conner, and seven others founded Shugart Associates, a company that pioneered the development of floppy disks.  At Shugart Associates, Conner was initially responsible for OEM Marketing ultimately becoming its Western Region Sales Manager. Shugart Associates was acquired in 1977 by Xerox.

Seagate Technology 
In 1979, Conner, Shugart, and two others founded the hard drive manufacturer Seagate Technology. Seagate pioneered the 5.25-inch hard disk drive form factor. The first 5.25-inch HDD was the ST506. Its capacity was 5 MBytes. By 1984, there were differences with Seagate management with Conner arguing that there was not enough emphasis on customer requests

Conner left Seagate (with $12 million in Seagate stock) to enjoy a semi-retirement.

Conner Peripherals 
In 1985 John Squires left Miniscribe and with financing from Terry Johnson (another Miniscribe founder) founded CoData to work on a new 3.5-inch disk drive. With a prototype of their product completed, Squires and Johnson in late 1985 approached Conner about joining Codata. In 1986, Conner merged his then defunct company Conner Peripherals into Squires and Johnson's CoData, adopting the name Conner Peripherals for the merged entity. Conner had trouble finding financing from venture capitalists, so he approached Compaq Computer, which was looking for a new disk drive for a portable computer that was under development.  Compaq provided $12 million of capital and by 1987 (the first year of mass production), Conner had sold $113 million in 3.5" HDDs - with 90% going Compaq.  The first 3.5-inch product was the CP340 HDD with a capacity of 20 MBytes. The subsequent HDD, CP341, established the popularity of the ATA interface supplied by Western Digital. By 1990, Conner Peripherals was the fastest growing start-up company in the history of US commerce, beating the competition with HDDs that were lighter, more compact, and consumed less power.  According to Finis Conner, one key aspect of success was to buy all the components (heads, disks, motors, chips) from other manufacturers but to excel in high-volume assembly and manufacturing.  Conner peripherals was merged into Seagate in February 1996 at which point he left the company.  For its fiscal year ending December 31, 1995 Conner reported about $2.4 billion in revenue compared to Seagate's fiscal year revenue of $4.5 billion.

Post Conner Peripherals 
Since the merger with Seagate, Conner has pursued a number of activities: 
He set up Conner Group which includes several enterprises some of which focus on Conner's interest in golf.
Conner Technology PLC was a manufacturer of low-cost 3.5-inch hard disk drives assembled in China, whose goal was to be a high-volume, low-cost supplier of mainstream hard disk drives to leading personal computer suppliers. The company could never deliver the low prices required for personal computer suppliers to switch, and the company shut down its operations in 1998 and merged with ExcelStor in 2001.
	
StorCard founded in 2002 was a company dedicated to developing a new standard in high capacity smart cards. StorCard offered an encrypted, low-cost removable card using semiconductor memory in a credit card size format, along with a compatible receiver mechanism.  It closed in 2005.
In 2010, Conner became CEO of Millenniata in Provo, Utah, which specializes in long-lasting optical archiving technology on the M-Disc.   Millenniata was forced into bankruptcy in 2016.
In 2013, he founded BluStor, a mobile app and smart card that stores fingerprints, voiceprints, facial recognition and iris scans to protect sensitive information.

Other interests and lifestyle 
Quoting from the lengthy 1990 article on Conner and Conner peripherals written by A. Pollack in The New York Times: 
"Even in a region known for its overnight millionaires, Finis F. Conner turns heads. With homes in Pebble Beach and Palm Springs, a collection of classic cars, private planes, yacht, speedboat and a near-professional golf game, Mr. Conner has become the epitome, or perhaps the caricature, of the Silicon Valley executive made good. He even commutes by plane."

References 

1943 births
Living people
American businesspeople